"Living Conditions" is the second episode of season 4 of the television show Buffy the Vampire Slayer. Buffy becomes convinced that her annoying roommate is evil, but her friends think she is crazy.

Plot
While Buffy gets ready to patrol, her roommate Kathy Newman begins to annoy her, becoming increasingly irritating. Buffy leaves to go and patrol the campus, however Kathy tags along with a reluctant Buffy. Soon enough they are attacked by a demon, however Buffy pushes Kathy into a bush resulting in her not seeing the demon. Buffy manages to fight it off, but as she leaves with Kathy they are being watched by two of the demons who comment "She may be the one."

The next morning, Buffy goes to Giles' flat to describe the previous night's monster. Buffy's atypical interest in what Giles has planned for the day arouses his suspicion, and when pressed she admits she is avoiding her dorm room until Kathy leaves for classes. As Buffy talks to Giles, Kathy is in the dorm room scrubbing the grass stain on her sweater from the previous night. Realizing it is ruined, Kathy wears one of Buffy's. Later on, Buffy goes to the Rocket Cafe for lunch, but sees Kathy in line. She cuts into the line to avoid her, and meets another student, Parker Abrams, who introduces himself. Buffy then joins Willow, Oz and Xander, but becomes annoyed when Kathy also joins them and drops her lunch on Buffy's sweater. That night, the tension between the roommates continues to grow and both angrily go to bed early. That night Buffy dreams of the demon that had attacked her the previous night performing a ritual on her body, and is shocked to find Kathy had the same dream.

The following day, Buffy explains the dream to Giles, Oz, and Willow. Willow also becomes concerned with Buffy's actions and attitude towards Kathy, so Oz agrees to go patrolling with her later that night. That night, the two demons meet again and one confirms that "she is the one." The group chants around a large fire, preparing to summon "the great Taparrich". Meanwhile, as Buffy returns to her dorm room she is angered to find Kathy and Parker getting along. Buffy makes Parker leave, but tells him they should meet again, before leaving to go and patrol. While talking with Oz, Buffy shows more anger towards Kathy, telling him something has to be done. After going to bed, Buffy has the same unsettling dream.

The following day, Buffy meets up with Willow, who tells her she is convinced Kathy is a demon due to her toenails growing even after being cut. Buffy goes on to tell Willow that she plans to kill Kathy. Willow, startled by her behaviour, forces Buffy to go and see Giles with the toenails. Upon arriving at Giles' house, Buffy is tied up by Oz and Xander, while Giles tells Buffy that he thinks she has been possessed by the demon. Giles leaves to go and collect supplies from the magic shop to perform an exorcism, while Oz and Xander watch Buffy. However Buffy gets free and knocks the boys unconscious before fleeing. When Giles returns with Willow, they wake up Oz and Xander, before Giles realises that Kathy is a demon.

Buffy arrives back at the dorm room and eventually engages in a fight with Kathy, which results in Buffy ripping off Kathy's face, revealing her to be one of the demons. Kathy confesses to Buffy that she escaped her dimension to go to college, and has been sucking out her soul while she slept, planning on making the demons take Buffy back to her dimension. As this happens, the two demons in the woods summon Taparrich, the leader of the demons. Meanwhile, Giles performs a spell that returns the parts of Buffy's soul already taken by Kathy, just before Taparrich arrives at the dorm and takes Kathy back to her dimension.

The next day, Willow becomes Buffy's roommate and moves her stuff into the room.

Reception 
A BBC reviewer praised actress "Dagney Kerr's nicely paced performance as Kathy" and added, "it's encouraging to find the regular cast so casually back together again after the worrying indications in the last episode that it would be difficult for the writers to find reasonable excuses for them to continue working as a team. This episode generally dispenses with explanations, and flows better because of it."

References

External links

Buffy the Vampire Slayer (season 4) episodes
1999 American television episodes
Television episodes written by Marti Noxon